Mike McDonald (born June 22, 1958) is a former professional American football player who played long snapper for nine seasons in the NFL.

He was first added to the roster of the Los Angeles Rams in late 1983, over three years after he had graduated from the University of Southern California, to fill in for the injured Doug Barnett.

References

1958 births
Living people
American football linebackers
American football long snappers
Los Angeles Rams players
Detroit Lions players
USC Trojans football players
North Hollywood High School alumni
Players of American football from Los Angeles